Summer of the Seventeenth Doll is an Australian play written by Ray Lawler and first performed at the Union Theatre in Melbourne on 28 November 1955. The play is considered to be the most significant in Australian theatre history, and a "turning point", openly and authentically portraying distinctly Australian life and characters. It was one of the first truly naturalistic "Australian" theatre productions.

It was originally published by Angus & Robertson, before moving to Fontana Press and then Currency Press

Plot
The play is set in Australia, in the Melbourne suburb of Carlton and it details the events of the summer of 1953, in the lives of six central characters. The structure of the play is such that the nature of these characters and their situation and history is not revealed immediately, but rather gradually established as the story unfolds. By the end, the story and all its facets have been indirectly explained.

The summer that the story spans marks the 17th year of an annual tradition in the lives of the characters, wherein two masculine sugarcane cutters, Arthur "Barney" Ibbot and Reuben "Roo" Webber, travel south to Melbourne for five months of frivolity and celebration with two city women, Olive Leech and Nancy (Roo bringing with him as a gift for Olive a kewpie doll, hence the name of the play). One of the women, Nancy, has apparently married some months before, and she is not present in the play, so in her place Olive has invited Pearl Cunningham to partake in the tradition. The other women present in the play are Kathie "Bubba" Ryan, a 22-year-old girl who has been coveting Olive and Nancy's lifestyle from her neighbouring house almost all her life, and Emma Leech, Olive's cynical, irritable, but wise mother.

As the play progresses, it becomes obvious that, for many collective reasons, this summer is different from others; it is full of tensions, strains to recreate lost youth, and from what is said of previous years, not a fraction of the fun that others have been. Steadily things become worse; Roo is revealed to be broke and is forced to take a job in a paint factory. He is disillusioned with his age and weaknesses, while relations between Barney and him are in doubt, due to a recent question of loyalty. The situation is agitated in part by Pearl's uptight indignation and refusal to accept the lifestyle she is being presented with as "proper" or "decent".

The play ends with a bitter fight between Olive and Roo after he proposes marriage to her and she is affronted, threatened by the prospect of any lifestyle other than the one to which she is accustomed. In the final scene, the two men leave together, the summer prematurely ended and the characters' futures uncertain.

Summer of the Seventeenth Doll is part of a trilogy generally referred to as the Doll Trilogy; the story of The Doll is preceded by the prequels Kid Stakes (1975), set in 1937, which tells the story of the first year of the tradition and the origin of the gift of the Kewpie doll, and Other Times (1976), which is set in 1945 and includes most of the same characters.

Productions

Melbourne
The Summer of the Seventeenth Doll had its world premiere on 28 November 1955, where it opened at the Union Theatre in Melbourne. This production of the play was directed by John Sumner and featured the following cast:
 Roma Johnston as Pearl Cunningham
 Fenella Maguire as Kathy "Bubba" Ryan
 June Jago as Olive Leech
 Ray Lawler as Barney Ibbot
 Carmel Dunn as Emma Leech
 Noel Ferrier as Roo Webber
 Malcolm Billings as Johnnie Dowd

Sydney
The play opened in Sydney, approximately two months later, on 10 January 1956, this time with significant changes to its cast:
 Madge Ryan as Pearl Cunningham
 Fenella Maguire as Kathie "Bubba" Ryan
 June Jago as Olive Leech
 Ray Lawler as Barney Ibbot
 Ethel Gabriel as Emma Leech
 Lloyd Berrell as Roo Webber
 John Llewellyn as Johnnie Dowd

Country tour
On 28 January 1956 a thirteen-week country tour of the play was announced, commencing on 14 February. The play toured New South Wales and Queensland, returning to Sydney for an encore season, and featured the following cast:
 Yvonne Lewis as Bubba Ryan
 Jacqueline Kott as Pearl Cunningham
 June Jago as Olive Leech
 Robert Levis as Barney Ibbot
 Dorothy Whiteley as Emma Leech
 Kenneth Warren as Roo Webber
 Keith Buckley as Johnnie Dowd

United Kingdom
After the final Sydney show of the play's country tour, The Doll moved to the United Kingdom, where it spent two weeks showing in Nottingham, Liverpool and Edinburgh before opening in London on 30 April 1957, with the following cast:
 Fenella Maguire as Bubba Ryan
 Madge Ryan as Pearl Cunningham
 June Jago as Olive Leech
 Ray Lawler as Barney Ibbot
 Ethel Gabriel as Emma Leech
 Kenneth Warren as Roo Webber
 Richard Pratt as Johnnie Dowd

New York
Encouraged by its wholehearted reception in Australia and Britain, Summer of the Seventeenth Doll took a trip to America, where audiences and critics were rather underwhelmed with the production, most likely due to drastic cultural differences.. The play opened in New York City on 23 January 1958, with no changes made to the cast. The Doll only ran for a five-week season in America.

However, in 1967, Summer of the Seventeenth Doll featuring an all-black cast, was produced to great acclaim as one of four plays in the inaugural season of The Negro Ensemble Company with an international bill that included, Kongi's Harvest by Wole Soyinka, Song of the Lusitanian Bogey by Peter Weiss, and Daddy Goodness by American playwright Richard Wright.

Film adaptation
After continuing to tour Australia through 1958, Summer of the Seventeenth Doll was adapted by Leslie Norman for Hecht-Hill-Lancaster Productions – whose first film had been Marty with Ernest Borgnine – for United Artists in 1959. The film was retitled Season of Passion for the American market. This decision was severely lamented by some fans of the play, whose complaints were rooted in three essential criticisms:
The "Americanisation" of the text, namely the casting of American actor Ernest Borgnine, who played his character (Roo) with an American accent. Others have thought the film was a recruiting film for migrants with the Englishman John Mills as Barney and Alan García as Dino, an Italian friend and fellow cane cutter who does not feature in the play. The female leads were played by Anne Baxter and Angela Lansbury, though the film featured many Australian actors.
It was set in Sydney rather than Melbourne.
The drastic changes to key plot points, namely the alternative, "happy" ending that the 1959 film adaptation entailed. This alternate ending was considered by some to be representative of a dire misunderstanding of the play and its message, and by others an attempt to make the film an international success at the box office and critical acclaim similar to the kitchen sink realism of Marty. The producers also added a comedy sequence where a young girl attempted to trick Roo in a tent at Luna Park.

1964 British TV adaptation
The play was adapted for British TV in 1964 as part of Thursday Theatre. The cast was:
Lyn Ashley as Bubba Ryan
Madge Ryan as Pearl Cunningham
Sheila Hancock as Olive Leech
Ewen Solon as Barney Ibbot
Grant Taylor as Roo Webber
Hazel Coppen as Emma Leech
George Roubicek as Johnny Dowd

1979 Australian TV adaptation
A version of the play was filmed in 1979, directed by Rod Kinnear. |

Christine Amor as Bubba Ryan
Sandy Gore  as Pearl Cunningham
Carole Skinner  as Olive Leech
Bruce Myles  as Barney Ibbot
Peter Curtin  as Roo Webber
Irene Inescourt  as Emma Leech
David Downer  as Johnny Dowd
Rowena Wallace  as Presenter

Most recent productions
Notable productions include:
1965: Sydney's Q Theatre staged a production of The Doll, in which Ethel Gabriel, a member of the cast for nearly a decade, gave her last performance as Emma
1973: Sydney's Nimrod Theatre Company staged a production with Bill Hunter
1974: Queensland Theatre Company staged a production
1977: Melbourne Theatre Company revived the play as part of The Doll Trilogy (featuring prequels Kid Stakes and Other Times)
August 1988: Brisbane's La Boite Theatre Company staged play, directed by Don Batchelor.
1983: Melbourne's Australian Nouveau Theatre (Antill) directed by Jean-Pierre Mignon
1985: Sydney Theatre Company revived the play as part of The Doll Trilogy directed by Rodney Fisher (which also played in Melbourne)
1988: Sydney Theatre Company production travelled overseas to New York
1990: Birmingham Repertory Theatre in the UK directed by John Adams
1995: Melbourne Theatre Company directed by Robyn Nevin, which also played a national tour through 1995 and 1996
2008: Brisbane's La Boite Theatre Company directed by Sean Mee.
2011: Belvoir production directed by Neil Armfield which toured Sydney, Melbourne (for Melbourne Theatre Company), Brisbane (for Queensland Theatre Company), Wollongong and Canberra through 2011 and 2012
2015: State Theatre Company of South Australia at the Dunstan Playhouse, Adelaide Festival Centre directed by Georgie Brookman
2020: Upcoming production by State Opera of South Australia in Her Majesty's Theatre, directed by Joseph Mitchell

The iPad app
In 2013 Currency Press released an iPad app which charts the 57-year history of Summer of the Seventeenth Doll.

The app collates archival material from the first production on 28 November 1955 up until the most recent Belvoir production, which toured the east coast of Australia in 2011/12. Material was sourced from a range of archives and institutions along the east coast of Australia.

The app features interviews with -

 Ray Lawler
 Neil Armfield – director of the 2011 / 2012 Belvoir Theatre production. 
 Alison Croggon – theatre critic and playwright.
 Sandy Gore – played Pearl in the 1977 MTC production of The Doll Trilogy, which was the first time the three plays had been performed in repertoire.
 Steve Le Marquand – played Roo in the 2011 / 2012 Belvoir production.
 John McCallum – Theatre Critic for The Australian
 Travis McMahon – played Barney in the 2012 Belvoir production.
 Susie Porter – played Olive in the 2011 Belvoir production.

Critiques
"Gender and Genre: The Summer of the Seventeenth Doll" by Jane Cousins

References

External links
'Playing the 20th century – episode four: Summer of the Seventeenth Doll', Radio National, 9 January 2011
Jane Cousins, 'Gender and Genre: The Summer of the Seventeenth Doll', Continuum: The Australian Journal of Media & Culture vol. 1 no 1 (1987)]
Article on Summer of the Seventeenth Doll at History of Australian Theatre 
Listing of Australian productions at AusStage
Copy of original play at National Archives of Australia

1955 plays
1950s Australian plays
Plays adapted into operas
Angus & Robertson books